Blixa Bargeld (born Christian Emmerich, 12 January 1959) is a German musician who has been the lead singer of the band Einstürzende Neubauten since its formation in 1980. Bargeld was also a founding member of the Australian rock band Nick Cave and the Bad Seeds, serving as a member from 1983 until his departure in 2003.

Early life
Bargeld left school prior to completion, and is self-taught. He experimented with audio equipment as a teenager, including the disassembling of tape recorders. The first album that he owned was by Pink Floyd, but he quickly moved on to German krautrock acts such as Kraftwerk, Neu! and Can, which he described as his biggest influences at the time.

Bargeld is from the Tempelhof area of West Berlin and he moved out of his parents' home in the late 1970s. A 2008 documentary featured him visiting his mother and talking to her about his childhood and the relationship that he had with his parents.

Career
In 1980, Bargeld founded the group Einstürzende Neubauten ("Collapsing New Constructions").  Bargeld spoke of the early days of Neubauten in 2010:

The starting point for Neubauten was more that we didn't have anything, so I didn't really have the choice to say 'I am doing this, I am doing that, or maybe I should play organ'. I didn't have any of these things, and I could not afford any of these things, and neither could anybody else in the group. It was more of the logical consequence of what can we obtain, and that's how it turned out. It certainly didn't start out as an artistic concept to say "let's do something different", it started as an extension of the live situation as it already was.

From 1983 to 2003, Bargeld was a guitarist and backing vocalist with Nick Cave and the Bad Seeds. He also sang lead vocals with Cave on several songs, such as "The Carny" and "The Weeping Song". Cave first saw Bargeld performing with Einstürzende Neubauten on TV while the Birthday Party, Cave's band at the time, were touring in Amsterdam. He described the music as "mournful", Bargeld as looking "destroyed", and his screams as: "a sound you would expect to hear from strangled cats or dying children."

Bargeld played guitar on the Gun Club song "Yellow Eyes" from their 1987 album Mother Juno. He also played on the album Novice by Alain Bashung in 1989.

Since the mid-1990s, Bargeld has appeared live with his solo Rede/Speech Performances. During these performances, usually supported by Neubauten's sound engineer Boris Wilsdorf, he works with microphones, sound effects, overdubbing with the help of sampler loops and speaks English or German. The performed pieces include a vocal creation of the DNA of an angel and a parody of a techno song.

In 2000 he worked together with Oliver Augst on the music for the plays Rosa Melonen Schnitt Freude based on words by Gertrude Stein and Rom, Blicke by Rolf Dieter Brinkmann, which they also performed together in Italy, Germany and Austria. 

In 2007, Bargeld started a collaborative project with Alva Noto (a.k.a. Carsten Nicolai) called ANBB, an abbreviation of Noto's and Bargeld's initials. An EP, Ret Marut Handshake, was released on 26 June 2010, followed later that year by a full-length album, Mimikry.

In June 2013, Bargeld collaborated with Italian composer Teho Teardo for an album called Still Smiling, which was released on the Specula record label. A music video for the song "Mi Scusi" was created and an Italian tour was scheduled.

In early October 2014, Neubauten announced 24 November 2014 as the release date for their next album, Lament, described as a "concept album based on a live performance and installation commissioned by the Flemish city of Diksmuide, Belgium to mark the centenary of the start of the First World War in 1914." Bargeld explained in the official press release: "The Second World War is nothing but the elongation of the first one … As a child of the post Second World War era, and the resulting division of Germany and Berlin, I’m of course hugely influenced in my upbringing about the results of that."

Bargeld explained in October 2014 that Neubauten is essentially a materialistic band, leading them to employ two scientific researchers to seek out material to support the development of Lament  after the album received financial backing in August 2013. The band opened their 2014 European tour in support of Lament with a performance in Diksmuide, Belgium.

Style and influences
Jennifer Shryane, in her book Blixa Bargeld and Einstürzende Neubauten: German Experimental Music. Evading do-re-mi (2011), explores how the themes and threads of Bargeld's work with Neubauten show even greater variation and experimentation in his performance work outside of the band. For example, the range extends from his surreal, electronic Dadaist-cabaret Rede and collaborations with Alva Noto to his expert direction of Coetzee’s Warten auf die Barbaren (Waiting for the Barbarians) for the Salzburg Festival in 2005, where he employed multi-layered symbolism through an ice-white setting and an interplay of voices, screams and noise.

Shryane’s book examines Bargeld's vocal strategies and his trademark scream (describing it in dance terms as an endless pirouette or unanticipated giant leap) and the labyrinthine concerns of his texts through Artaudian performance theory (The Theatre and its Double, 1938). She also stresses Bargeld’s passionate stance on the socializing aspects of music (à la John Cage), citing his comment on Grundstück that "it’s the social aspects which are important for me."

Instruments
Bargeld's guitars of choice are a Fender Jaguar and a Fender Mustang, as seen on the concert DVD God Is in The House and at various media appearances. Initially he used a battered Höfner Model 173 and a red Höfner Colorama II until they "broke down." After his effect pedals were stolen in the early 1980s, he relied exclusively on the Fender floating/dynamic tremolo (like the Höfner units), which both raise and lower pitch, along with Fender Twin amplifiers, metal slides and changing his amp settings for each individual song to create a unique guitar sound.

Personal life
Bargeld is married to Chinese-American mathematician Erin Zhu, daughter of the entrepreneur Min Zhu. The couple has a daughter. Together they developed the concept of web-based fan subscriptions as a new business model for musicians. The couple is featured among 37 other design and media figures in the 2010 book Designing Media by designer and IDEO co-founder Bill Moggridge. The couple resides in San Francisco, Beijing and Berlin.

Bargeld was a vegetarian for 30 years, but stopped as a result of difficulties that he encountered while practicing vegetarianism in China. He was a smoker for a long period, but quit in the early 2000s. The sound of Bargeld smoking a cigarette is a part of Einstürzende Neubauten's song "Silence Is Sexy" (2000), which is featured on the Silence Is Sexy studio album.

Discography

Albums 
 1995 – Commissioned Music (music commissioned and performed for various theatre plays – including a version of "Somewhere Over the Rainbow")
 2010 – Mimikry (with Alva Noto as ANBB, on Raster-Noton label – album also features contributions from Verushka)
 2013 – Still Smiling by Teho Teardo & Blixa Bargeld (Specula Records)
2014 – Spring by Teho Teardo & Blixa Bargeld
2016 – Nerissimo by Teho Teardo & Blixa Bargeld (Specula Records / Rough Trade) - Release date: 22 April 2016
2017 – Fall by Teho Teardo & Blixa Bargeld

EPs 

 2010 – Ret Marut Handshake (EP) (collaboration with Alva Noto under the moniker ANBB; on the Raster-Noton label)

Other appearances 
 2013 – "Grand Hotel Tbilisi" (from Songs of Decadence: A Soundtrack to the Writings of Stanisław Przybyszewski)

Other recordings

Band work 
 Bargeld performed on all Einstürzende Neubauten recordings. 
 Bargeld played guitar and sang on all studio recordings for Nick Cave and the Bad Seeds from 1984 to 2003.

Session work 
 1993 – actor in radio play Radio Inferno 
 1996 – "Die Sonne" (for Gudrun Gut and Members of the Ocean Club single) 
 1998 – vocals on Bad Blood album by Ice
 2001 – actor in Elementarteilchen (audioplay based on Michel Houellebecq's novel Les Particules élémentaires)
 2009 – guitars on Novice LP by Alain Bashung
2015 – Marcher sur la tête by KiKu feat. Blixa Bargeld & Black Cracker, composed by Yannick Barman (Everest Records)
2017 – Eng, Düster und Bang by KiKu feat. Blixa Bargeld & Black Cracker, composed by Yannick Barman yannickbarman.com(everest records) kikusound.com everestrecords.ch
2021 – Bright Magic by Public Service Broadcasting feat. Blixa Bargeld on the track Der Rhythmus der Maschinen

Readings 

 2006 – Blixa Bargeld liest Bertolt Brecht Erotische Gedichte (spoken voice recording in German of Bertolt Brecht's erotic poems)

Compositions 

 2000 – Recycled (composed by Blixa Bargeld, arranged by Tim Isfort and performed by his orchestra)
 2001 – Elementarteilchen (score)

Filmography
Bad Blood for the Vampyr
Recycled
Die Totale Therapie
Die Terroristen!
Wings of Desire (as himself, during the Nick Cave and the Bad Seeds performance)
Dandy (1987, directed by Peter Sempel)
Nihil oder Alle Zeit der Welt (as himself, 1988, directed by Uli M Schueppel)
 (1981)
Jahre der Kälte/Frozen Stories (filmmusic, 1993, directed by Uli M Schueppel)
Liebeslieder (1995)
Code Red (1997)
The Mummy (1999) (Mummy sounds)
Palast der Republik (2004)
Halber Mensch (2005)
On Tour with Neubauten.org (2006)
Listen With Pain (2006)
Blixa Bargeld: Rede / Speech DVD (2006)
 Elektrokohle – von wegen (as himself, filmmusic, (1994, directed by Uli M Schueppel)
Hornbach commercials (German hardware store) reading tool catalogs as spoken word
20,000 Days on Earth (2014)
 B-Movie: Lust & Sound in West-Berlin
 Swans: Where Does a Body End? (as himself, 2020, directed by Marco Porsia)

References

External links

 Official website
 Einstürzende Neubauten official website

1959 births
ARIA Award winners
Living people
Einstürzende Neubauten members
German experimental musicians
German industrial musicians
German rock guitarists
German male guitarists
German spoken word artists
Nick Cave and the Bad Seeds members
Noise musicians
San Francisco Art Institute faculty